Guido Ascoli (12 December 1887, in Livorno – 10 May 1957, in Torino) was an Italian mathematician, known for his contributions to the theory of partial differential equations, and for his works on the teaching of mathematics in secondary high schools.

Selected publications
 (available from the "Edizione Nazionale Mathematica Italiana"). A book collecting the winning papers of the 1935 prize of the Annali della Reale Scuola Normale Superiore di Pisa. An English translation of the title reads as:-"Partial differential equations of elliptic and parabolic type".

Biographical references
 
Guido Ascoli
, available from the Biblioteca Digitale Italiana di Matematica.
. "Italian mathematicians of the first century of the unitary state" is an important historical memoir giving brief biographies of the Italian mathematicians who worked and lived between 1861 and 1961. Its content is available from the website of the.

Italian mathematicians
20th-century Italian Jews
Livornese Jews
PDE theorists
1887 births
1957 deaths